Shwayze, an American rapper, has released five studio albums and eight singles. On August 19, 2008, Shwayze released his self-titled debut album, Shwayze. The album had two singles on it, "Buzzin'" and "Corona and Lime". On October 27, 2009, his second studio album, Let It Beat, was released.

Albums

Shwayze Summer 
The album Shwayze Summer was released on July 14, 2013. Its first single for the album was "Love is Overrated" produced by Paul Couture. This is Shwayze's first full-length debut album as a solo artist without his previous singer Cisco Adler. Shwayze stated in an interview that they both needed a musical break from each other, but they are still on good terms. The album contains 12 tracks and features The Cataracs, Tayyib Ali, Devin K, Paul Couture, Ferrari Snowday, Marco and Austin Paul.

Singles

Mixtapes 

Rich Girls (2008)
Love Stoned (2010)
The W's (2011)
Greatest Hits You've Never Heard (2014)

EPs 

Shwayzed & Confused (EP) (2012) 
King of the Summer (EP) (2015)

Music videos

Shwayze Music Videos

Video Appearances

Guest appearances 

Cisco Adler – Motorcycle (feat. Shwayze & Mickey Avalon)
Cisco Adler – Stick Up (feat. Shwayze)
Cisco Adler – Cheap Champagne (feat. Shwayze)
The All-American Rejects – Gives You Hell Remix (feat. Shwayze)
Paradiso Girls – Patron Tequila Remix (feat. Shwayze)
Keely Julian – No Chaser (feat. Shwayze)
Pittsburgh Slim – Undressed (feat. Shwayze)
Dr. Hollywood – Breakfast at Tiffany's (feat. Shwayze)
Cisco Adler – California Girl (feat. Shwayze)
Cisco Adler – High High High (feat. Shwayze)
CIsco Adler – More Than a Fan (feat. Shwayze)
Hoodie Allen – Wave Goodbye (feat. Shwayze)
Sky Blu - Pop Bottles (feat. Mark Rosas)
Mark Rosas - Reaction (feat. Chelsea Korka)

References 

Hip hop discographies
Discographies of American artists